The fifth season of Married at First Sight premiered on 29 January 2018 on the Nine Network. Relationship experts John Aiken, Mel Schilling and Trisha Stratford all returned from the previous season to match 11 brides and 11 grooms together, including John Robertson who previously appeared in season 4.

Couple profiles

Commitment ceremony history
 
  This couple left the experiment outside of commitment ceremony.
  This couple elected to leave the experiment during the commitment ceremony.

Controversy
Contestants Dean Wells and Davina Rankin were involved in a cheating scandal that blindsided their respective partners, Tracey Jewel and Ryan Gallagher. Dean and Davina had planned to write "leave" at the commitment ceremony, but instead Dean chose to stay with Tracey and deny any wrongdoing when Davina called out his lies over their affair. Dean further infuriated fans when during a "boy's night" he led a conversation on wife swapping and asking the other grooms if any of their wife's mothers were attractive.

Ratings

References

5
2018 Australian television seasons
Television shows filmed in Australia